Souvarit is a Finnish song and dance music ensemble founded in 1978, a schlager pop band that plays mainly Lapland-themed dance music.

The founding members included Lasse Hoikka on lead vocals, Tapani Peura and Juha Salmivuori. It has seen many line-up changes since then, but always highlighted the vocals of its founding member.

Lasse Hoikka
Lasse Hoikka (born Tervola), is a famous Finnish singer and musician and lead singer of Souvarit since 1978. Hoikka has also developed a solo career releasing albums of his own.

Members
The set-up of Souvarit has varied over time. Members were:
Vocals
Lasse Hoikka (1978–)
Keyboards
Jouni Ruokamo (1990–)
Accordion
Tapani Peura (1978–1979)
Jorma Kyrö (1979–1983)
Martti Honkanen (1983–1986)
Jukka Lampela (1986–2013)
Mikko Keskimaunu (2014–2019)
Marko Jolkkonen (2019–)
Bass
Juha Salmivuori (1978–1980)
Pauli Ruuskanen (1980–1983, 2015–)
Juha Torvinen (1983–1985)
Jorma Hietala (1985–2015)
Drums
Lasse Hoikka (1978–2011)
Timo Salmela (2011–2017)
Pasi Alakurtti (2017–)

Discography

Souvarit
(peak position in Finnish charts wherever applicable)
1980: Lapinkävijän laulut
1982: Kotijärvi
1983: Jätkän oma kulta
1984: Nuoruuden tie 
1998: Kultamailla
1989: Parhaat
1990: Tukkipojat 
1990: Suosituimmat Souvarit
1990: Neljän tuulen tie
1991: Laulajan tie
1993: Lapin luonto luo outoa taikaa...
1993: Sinisenä lintuna haluaisin lentää
1994: Hallayön kukka
1995: Tuntureiden tunnelmaa
1995: Lapin Kaipuu
1996: Kultakuume
1998: Lapin luonto luo outoa taikaa
1998: Tähtiyö ja Kuutamo
1999: Rakkaus Lappiin - 20-vuotis juhlalevy!
2000: Tunturituuli
2001: Kuukkelin suosituimmat
2001: Amore Mio (FIN #33)
2003: Souvarit Tunnelmoiden
2004: 25-vuotis juhlalevy (FIN #35)
2005: Kaupunki kahden virran
2007: Pohjolan yö
2008: 30-vuotis juhlalevy
2009: Kultamaan lauluja
2009: Toivotuimmat joululaulut
2010: Leksan muistosoitot

Various rereleases and compilations
1991: Parhaat (plus 6 new tracks)
1997: 20 suosikkia - Jätkän oma kulta
1997: Neljän tuulen tie (plus 6 new  + 6 new tracks)
1997: Tukkipojat (plus 6 new tracks)
2002: 10 uutta & 10 suosituinta
2003: Suosituimmat Souvarit 80-luvulta
2004: 40 tuttua & toivotuinta 
2007: 40 tuttua & toivotuinta 2
2007: 40 unohtumatonta laulua

Joint albums
2003: Souvarit ja Lasse Hoikka parhaat 80-luvulta
2004: Souvarit ja Lasse Hoikka sekä Ilpo Karisen Orkesteri
2010: Lasse Hoikka ja Rautukopla

Lasse Hoikka (solo)
(peak position in Finnish charts wherever applicable)
2014: Taas kutsuu tie (FIN #26)
2007: Kun aika on (FIN #39)
2006: Maankiertäjät (FIN #10)

References

External links
Official website

Finnish schlager groups